Luca Unbehaun (born 27 February 2001) is a German footballer who plays as a goalkeeper for Borussia Dortmund. He was included in The Guardians "Next Generation 2018".

International career
Unbehaun has represented Germany at numerous youth levels.

Career statistics

Honours
Individual
Fritz Walter Medal U17 Bronze: 2018

References

External links
Profile at the Borussia Dortmund website

2001 births
Living people
German footballers
Germany youth international footballers
Association football goalkeepers
Regionalliga players
3. Liga players
VfL Bochum players
Borussia Dortmund players
Borussia Dortmund II players
Sportspeople from Bochum
Footballers from North Rhine-Westphalia